Giorgian Daniel de Arrascaeta Benedetti (born 1 June 1994) is a Uruguayan professional footballer who plays as an attacking midfielder for Campeonato Brasileiro Série A club Flamengo and the Uruguay national team.

De Arrascaeta played for Uruguay U20 and has been a member of the senior team since 2014. He represented the nation at the Copa América in 2015, 2019 and 2021, as well as the FIFA World Cup in 2018 and 2022.

Club career

Defensor Sporting
De Arrascaeta debuted for Defensor Sporting in the Uruguayan Primera División in October 2012, four months after his 18th birthday. He was a member of the team as it won the 2013 Clausura championship, and played in the Championship play-off, a 3–1 loss to Peñarol.

Cruzeiro
De Arrascaeta's performances for Defensor in its run to the semi-finals of the 2014 Copa Libertadores attracted the Brazilian champions Cruzeiro. On 17 January 2015 Cruzeiro secured de Arrascaeta signing by agreeing to pay €4 million to acquire 50% of his economic rights.

In Cruzeiro, de Arrascaeta formed what became known as "La Banda", along with former Vélez Sarsfield stars Lucas Romero and Ariel Cabral. This trio, along with fellow stars Thiago Neves and Robinho helped Cruzeiro win the 2017 Copa do Brasil, 2018 Campeonato Mineiro, and 2018 Copa do Brasil, scoring decisive goals in all three finals.

On 4 February 2018 Cruzeiro won 1–0 against América Mineiro at Mineirão, in a 2018 Campeonato Mineiro match. De Arrascaeta scored the only goal of the match with a volley kick, later that year he received his first nomination to the FIFA Puskás Award for that goal.

Flamengo
During 2019 preseason Flamengo began to show interest in de Arrascaeta. On 3 January 2019, he didn't show up on training sessions after the summer break trying to force his exit from Cruzeiro. Claiming to receive thousands of insults, on 7 January 2019, Cruzeiro's and Flamengo's representatives went to Uruguay to resolve the problem: on 8 January, the transfer was completed for a record €15million, or R$63 million, the biggest transfer in Brazilian football history. On 12 January he was announced as a new player, becoming Flamengo's biggest transfer fee paid at that time, signing a five year deal.

Against Goiás in the second match under Jorge Jesus management de Arrascaeta scored a hat trick, with all of his goals scored in the first half, in the 6–1 win at Maracanã Stadium on 14 July 2019.

On 25 August 2019 de Arrascaeta scored on beautiful bicycle kick, after a Rafinha cross, in a 3–0 win against Ceará at Castelão. With that goal he won the 2019 Campeonato Brasileiro Série A goal of the season award and also has been nominated to the FIFA Puskás Award for the second time in his career.

On 23 November 2019 de Arrascaeta assisted Gabriel Barbosa on Flamengo's first goal in the 2019 Copa Libertadores Final, Flamengo won 2–1 over River Plate. Less than 24 hours later, Flamengo became champions of the 2019 Campeonato Brasileiro Série A, with de Arrascaeta netting 14 assists and leading the league for the second time in his career.

On 25 February 2022 de Arrascaeta extended his contract with Flamengo until 31 December 2026.

De Arrascaeta finished the 2022 season in high level being named to Campeonato Brasileiro Série A Team of the Year for the second time in his career and to the Bola de Prata for the third time.

On 28 February 2023, the second leg of the 2023 Recopa Sudamericana was played at the Maracanã Stadium with a season record attendance of 71,411. Flamengo won 1–0, de Arrascaeta scored the winning goal on the last play of the match on the 96th minute. The score forced extra time which remained scoreless. Ironically de Arrascaeta missed the only penalty kick in the shootout as Independiente del Valle won 5–4 and lifted the trophy for the first time.

International career

After scoring twice for Uruguay as they finished runners-up at the 2013 FIFA U-20 World Cup, De Arrascaeta made his debut for the Uruguay senior team in a friendly match against South Korea in September 2014. He assisted the only goal of the game, scored by José Giménez, in the 1–0 win in Goyang.

De Arrascaeta was included in Uruguay's squad for the 2015 Copa América by coach Óscar Tabárez. He was assigned the prestigious number 10 shirt, previously worn by national team legend Diego Forlán. On 6 June 2015, de Arrascaeta scored his first senior international goal during a 5–1 pre-tournament friendly win over Guatemala in Montevideo. De Arrascaeta made his tournament debut as a 64th-minute substitute as Uruguay defeated Jamaica 1–0 in their opening group match on 13 June. In May 2018 he was named in Uruguay's provisional 26-man squad for the 2018 FIFA World Cup in Russia.

On 10 June 2021, de Arrascaeta was confirmed in the Uruguay 2021 Copa América final squad.

On 2 December 2022, de Arrascaeta scored both goals in a 2–0 victory over Ghana, in the last match of group stage in the 2022 FIFA World Cup in Qatar. This was not enough to qualify Uruguay to the knockout stage as South Korea won 2–1 against Portugal, advancing from the group stage on the tiebreaking.

Career statistics

Club

International

Scores and results list Uruguay's goal tally first.

Honours

Defensor
Uruguayan Primera División: 2012–13 Clausura

Cruzeiro
Copa do Brasil: 2017, 2018
Campeonato Mineiro: 2018

Flamengo
Copa Libertadores: 2019, 2022
Recopa Sudamericana: 2020
Campeonato Brasileiro Série A: 2019, 2020
Copa do Brasil: 2022
Supercopa do Brasil: 2020, 2021
Campeonato Carioca: 2019, 2020, 2021
Individual
Campeonato Carioca Team of the Year: 2021, 2022
Campeonato Brasileiro Série A Team of the Year: 2018, 2019, 2022
Bola de Prata: 2019, 2020, 2022
Copa Libertadores Team of the Tournament: 2021, 2022
South American Team of the Year: 2019, 2021, 2022

Personal life
De Arrascaeta is Roman Catholic. He is of Basque and Italian descent.

References

External links

1994 births
Living people
People from Río Negro Department
Uruguayan Roman Catholics
Uruguayan footballers
Association football midfielders
Defensor Sporting players
Cruzeiro Esporte Clube players
CR Flamengo footballers
Uruguayan Primera División players
Campeonato Brasileiro Série A players
Copa Libertadores-winning players
Uruguay under-20 international footballers
Uruguay international footballers
2013 South American Youth Championship players
2015 Copa América players
2018 FIFA World Cup players
2019 Copa América players
2021 Copa América players
2022 FIFA World Cup players
Uruguayan expatriate footballers
Uruguayan expatriate sportspeople in Brazil
Expatriate footballers in Brazil